Ruth Lorenzo is a Spanish singer and composer. She rose to fame coming fifth in the fifth series of the British TV talent show The X Factor in 2008. Her discography consists of two studio albums, five extended plays, seven singles as a lead artist and three singles as a featured artist. She released her debut single "Burn" on 27 June 2011, the song peaked to number 16 on the Spanish Singles Chart. The song is a cover originally sung by London-based singer Caiyo (aka Francis Rodino) from his 2009 album Circles and Squares.

Her debut studio album Planeta Azul, was released in October 2014, peaking at number 3 on the Spanish Albums Chart. "Dancing in the Rain" was released as the lead single from the album on 18 February 2014; the song peaked at number 5 on the Spanish Singles Chart. It was chosen to represent Spain at the Eurovision Song Contest 2014 in Denmark, where it placed 9th with 74 points. "Gigantes" was released as the second single from the album on 7 October 2014, peaking at number 6 in Spain. "Renuncio" was released as the third single from the album on 17 February 2015, and reached number 49 in Spain. "99" was released as the lead single from the special edition of the album on 17 February 2015.

Loveaholic is the title of her second studio album, including songs such as "Good Girls Don't Lie", "My Last Song", "Loveaholic" or "Bring Back the New", among others. The album includes "Another day" a collaboration with acclaimed guitarist Jeff Beck.

Studio albums

Extended plays

Singles

As lead artist

As featured artist

Promotional Singles

Soundtracks

References

Discographies of Spanish artists